2021 Charleston Open may refer to:

 2021 Volvo Car Open, an annual WTA 500 tennis tournament
 2021 MUSC Health Women's Open, a WTA 250 tennis tournament created after several tournaments cancelled by the COVID-19 pandemic